Nicolas de Herberay des Essarts (died c. 1557), French translator, was born in Picardy.

Translations
Herberay des Essarts served in the artillery. At the express desire of Francis I, he translated into French the first eight books of the Spanish work Amadís de Gaula (1540–48). The remaining books were translated by other authors.

His other translations from the Spanish include L'Amant maltraite de sa mye (1539), Le Prèmier Livre de la chronique de dom Flores de Grèce (1552), and L'Horloge des princes (1555) from Antonio de Guevara. He also translated the works of Josephus (1557).

The Amadis de Gaula was translated into English by Anthony Munday in 1619.

References

1550s deaths
Spanish–French translators
Greek–French translators
Year of birth unknown
16th-century French translators